Medal of Honor is a 2009 Romanian drama film directed by Călin Peter Netzer.

The plot revolves around a retiree who is mistakenly awarded a military distinction. Former Romanian president Ion Iliescu plays himself in the film.

Cast 
 Victor Rebengiuc - Ion
 Camelia Zorlescu - Nina
 Mimi Branescu - Cornel
 Florina Fernandes - Rita - Cornel's wife

References

External links 

2009 drama films
2009 films
Romanian drama films
Films directed by Călin Peter Netzer
2000s Romanian-language films